Arthur Malcolm Price (born 30 April 1946) is a retired English motorcycle speedway rider. He won the Second Division Riders Championship in 1973 and made several appearances for the England national speedway team.

Biography
Born in Wolverhampton, Price began his speedway career in 1968, signing for British League team Wolverhampton Wolves and making his competitive debut on loan to Division Two teams Crayford Kestrels and Nelson Admirals. In 1969 he moved on to King's Lynn Stars, moving up with the team into Division One of the British League in 1970, while continuing to ride in Division Two for Boston Barracudas where he won the League and Cup double in 1973. In 1974 he transferred to Cradley United, scoring solidly at an average of 5.56 points in his first season for the club and improving to a league average of 8.00 in 1975. This level of performance was not maintained in subsequent years and in 1978 he dropped down to the National League with Workington Comets, finishing the season as the team's highest-averaged rider on 8.63. After seasons with Scunthorpe Stags, Nottingham Outlaws, and Oxford Cheetahs he retired in 1981.

Price competed in the Second Division Riders final for four consecutive years between 1970 and 1973, finishing as runner-up in 1972 and champion in 1973.

He represented the Division Two-level 'Young England' team between 1969 and 1973, and progressed to the full England team in 1974 in a match against the Soviet Union. He represented England again in 1975 against Poland. In all, he represented Young England in 28 matches and the full England team in three.

References

1946 births
Living people
Sportspeople from Wolverhampton
British speedway riders
Crayford Kestrels riders
King's Lynn Stars riders
Boston Barracudas riders
Cradley Heathens riders
Workington Comets riders
Scunthorpe Scorpions riders
Oxford Cheetahs riders